Begli Nurmyradow (born May 27, 1981) is a Turkmen footballer (defender) playing currently for HTTU Aşgabat. He scored one critical goal in the game versus Kyrgyzstan in 2010 AFC Challenge Cup.

International Career Statistics

Goals for Senior National Team

External links

Living people
1981 births
Turkmenistan footballers
Turkmenistan international footballers
Association football defenders